Come On Primates Show Your Teeth! (often shortened to Come On Primates!) is Frog Pocket's (AKA John Charles Wilson) third album, released in 2007. It is his second album with the record label Planet Mu. The artwork was created by John Charles Wilson himself, in his home of Ayr, Scotland.

Track listing

External links 
 
 Discography at Discogs
 Artist page at Planet Mu
 Come On Primates! Album Page at Planet Mu

2007 albums
Planet Mu albums